Spondianthus is a genus of plant, in the family Phyllanthaceae and is the only genus comprised in the tribe  Spondiantheae. It was first described as a genus in 1905. The genus contains only one recognized species, Spondianthus preussii, widespread across much of tropical Africa from Liberia to Mozambique.

Subspecies
 Spondianthus preussii subsp. glaber (Engl.) J.Léonard & Nkounkou – from Nigeria to Tanzania south to Angola; also Guinea, Ivory Coast
 Spondianthus preussii subsp. preussii – from Liberia to Zaire

Formerly included
moved to: Protomegabaria
Spondianthus obovatus Engl. – Protomegabaria stapfiana (Beille) Hutch.

References

Phyllanthaceae
Phyllanthaceae genera
Monotypic Malpighiales genera
Flora of Africa